Nebojša Vukojičić (born 12 March 1982) is a Serbian football attacking midfielder.

References

External links
 

1982 births
Living people
Sportspeople from Kragujevac
Association football midfielders
FK Sloboda Užice players
FK Sloga Kraljevo players
FK Zemun players
FK Inđija players
FK Novi Pazar players
FK Dinamo Vranje players
RFK Novi Sad 1921 players
FK Sevojno players
FK Hajduk Kula players
FK Radnik Bijeljina players
Serbian First League players
Serbian footballers